Marcos Juan Gutiérrez (born 30 November 1970) is a former Argentine goalkeeper who last played for Chilean club Deportes La Serena.

One of his milestones in Chilean football was to save a penalty to Esteban Paredes, Primera División de Chile all–time top scorer. Likewise, in the same game, his team, Deportes La Serena, achieved a historic 4–0 victory over Chilean giants Colo-Colo.

References

External links
 

1970 births
Living people
Argentine footballers
Argentine expatriate footballers
Argentinos Juniors footballers
Club Atlético Huracán footballers
Newell's Old Boys footballers
San Martín de Tucumán footballers
Olimpo footballers
Talleres de Córdoba footballers
Chilean Primera División players
Deportes La Serena footballers
Expatriate footballers in Chile
Expatriate footballers in Mexico
Toros Neza footballers
Liga MX players
Association football goalkeepers
Sportspeople from Jujuy Province